Stevon Roberts (born 15 January 1971) is a Barbadian sprinter. He competed in the men's 4 × 400 metres relay at the 1992 Summer Olympics.

References

1971 births
Living people
Athletes (track and field) at the 1992 Summer Olympics
Barbadian male sprinters
Barbadian male middle-distance runners
Olympic athletes of Barbados
Place of birth missing (living people)
Central American and Caribbean Games medalists in athletics